The Wish Giver: Three Tales of Coven Tree is a 1983 young adult or children's book by Bill Brittain.  The "wish giver" in the title refers to the enigmatic man who gives three children a wish to make their deepest dreams come true, but the wishes are not worded carefully, and go horribly wrong.

The Wish Giver was the recipient of a Newbery Honor in 1984.

Plot summary

Prologue
The narrator, Stewart Meade (nicknamed "Stew Meat"), meets a strange man named Thaddeus Blinn in a carnival tent and notices something unusual about him.  Stew Meat sees that there are three children in the tent who he recognizes as Polly, Rowena, and Adam. Blinn sells each of them a card with a red spot in the middle, for only 50 cents each, explaining that all they have to do is to press their finger on the spot, make a wish out loud, and it will come true – exactly as they word it.

Jug-A-Rum
Polly, an 11-year-old girl loves to play with bullfrogs and her only two friends. She wishes to be popular, and have the school's two most popular girls, Agatha and Eunice, to like her and invite her over for a tea party in which they would pretend to talk like real ladies. Her wish is granted, but now she croaks like a frog when she says vain, mean words about other people. Her sudden croaking in the middle of class causes her to become the center of attention – amid much grins and guffaws – at school. Agatha and Eunice invite her over, but she learns during her visit that they are snobbish and unlikable people, and they only invited her to ridicule her for her croaking. She realizes that her habit of gossiping and talking about her classmates behind their backs has kept them from befriending her.

The Tree Man
Rowena wishes that Henry Piper, a traveling salesman she is infatuated with, but only sees two times a year, will "set roots down in Coven Tree and never leave again!" Her wish is fulfilled word-for-word: his feet become literally rooted to the ground, and he gradually transforms into a sycamore tree.  Rowena finds out that he never really loved her, but only pretended to so that her father would like more of his items. She also develops a liking for the family's farmhand, Sam Waxman, who helps her throughout the situation with Henry.

Water, Water, Everywhere
Adam lives on a farm that requires water to be trucked in every few days, so he wishes for it to be covered with some as far as the eye can see. The next day, he is taught dowsing and finds the dowsing rod reacting at every turn. When he digs through the soil, a huge geyser shoots out which initially causes his parents, Edward and Sarah, to be joyful. But soon the geyser grows out of control, flooding the entire farm.

Epilogue
Adam, Polly, and Rowena run to Stew Meat, asking him to fix their wishes, since he has the only other wishing card in Coven Tree. He accepts, and he grants all their wishes. Polly no longer says mean things about other people and thus never croaks again; Henry is restored to human form, but Rowena forgets him and dates Sam instead; Adam travels around the world to dowse.

Reception
Kirkus Reviews described it as "another entertaining tale of magic and transformation." and "Brittain's knack for old-fashioned, funny-scary storytelling makes this another playfully atmospheric tale of strange doings in yesterday's New England."

References

1983 American novels
American children's novels
Newbery Honor-winning works
Harper & Row books
1983 children's books
Children's fantasy novels